This list of economics awards is an index to articles about notable awards for economics. The list is organized by region and country of the sponsoring organization, but awards may be given to economists from other countries.

General

Americas

Asia

Europe

Economic development awards

See also

 Lists of awards
 Lists of science and technology awards
 List of social sciences awards
 List of business and industry awards

References

 
Economics